The Windward Islands Cricket Board is the ruling body for cricket in the following West Indian islands: Grenada, Saint Lucia, Saint Vincent and the Grenadines and Dominica. Although Dominica is geographically part of the Leeward Islands, as it was part of the Windward Islands colony from 1940 until its independence, its cricket federation remains a part of the Windward Islands.

The Secretariat of WICB is based in St. Vincent and the Grenadines, while the franchise (Windwards Volcanoes) is based in Grenada. 

Dr. Kishore Shallow was elected as president in 2019, replacing Emmanuel Nathan.

Windward Islands Constituent Associations
Dominica Cricket Association
Grenada Cricket Association
St. Lucia Cricket Association
St. Vincent & the Grenadines Cricket Association

Principals of Windward Islands Cricket Board

WICB Presidents
Julian Hunte 
Lennox John
Emmanual Nanthan
Dr. Kishore Shallow: 2019–present

See also 
 Windward Islands cricket team

References

Cricket in Dominica
Cricket in Grenada
Cricket in Saint Lucia
Cricket in Saint Vincent and the Grenadines
Cricket in the Windward Islands
Sports governing bodies in Saint Lucia
Cricket administration in the West Indies